Alfred Herman Arndt (born July 15, 1911 – June 6, 1969) was a professional American football guard and halfback in the National Football League.

External links
NFL.com profile

1911 births
People from Brown County, Minnesota
Players of American football from Minnesota
American football offensive linemen
American football running backs
Pittsburgh Steelers players
South Dakota State Jackrabbits football players
South Dakota State University alumni
1969 deaths